Mark Andrew Wright (born 29 January 1970, in Manchester, England) is a former professional footballer, who played for Everton, Blackpool, Huddersfield Town, Wigan Athletic and Chorley. He now works for Progress Sports in Merseyside which is a large training provider for learners aged 14–19.

References

1970 births
Living people
English footballers
Footballers from Manchester
Association football defenders
English Football League players
Everton F.C. players
Blackpool F.C. players
Huddersfield Town A.F.C. players
Wigan Athletic F.C. players
Chorley F.C. players